The Fire Devil (German: Der Feuerteufel) is a 1940 German historical adventure film directed by and starring Luis Trenker. It also featured Judith Holzmeister, Bertl Schultes and Hilde von Stolz. The title is sometimes translated as The Arsonist.

The film's sets were designed by the art directors Erich Grave and Ludwig Reiber. It was shot at the Bavaria Studios in Munich. Location shooting took place in Mittenwald, Schwäbisch Hall and North Tyrol. It premiered at the Ufa-Palast am Zoo in Berlin. Costing over a million reichsmarks to make, it easily recouped its production costs at the box office and was a considerable popular success.

It is set during the Tyrolean Rebellion against Napoleon, about which Trenker had previously made another film The Rebel in 1932. However Adolf Hitler, who had been an admirer of the previous film, was apparently displeased feeling that the parallels between Napoleon and the Third Reich meant that the film glorified and potentially incited popular revolt against the regime. To restore himself to favour, Trenker published a novel Captain Ladurner which was overtly pro-Nazi.

Cast
 Luis Trenker as Valentin Sturmegger 
 Judith Holzmeister as Maria Schmiederer
 Bertl Schultes as Clemens Schmiederer
 Hilde von Stolz as Marquise Antoinette de Chanel 
 Fritz Kampers as Kaptän Münzer 
 Franz Herterich as Kaiser Franz I. von Österreich
 Ernst Fritz Fürbringer as Fürst von Metternich
 Erich Ponto as Kaiser Napoleon Bonaparte
 Claus Clausen as Major Ferdinand von Schill
 Karl-Heinz Peters as Französischer Kommissar 
 Walter Ladengast as Rafael Kröss, Verräter 
 Ludwig Kerscher as Kluiber, Kärntner Bauer 
 Vera Hartegg as Magd 
 Ludwig Schmid-Wildy as Klotz, Kärntner Bauer 
 Friedrich Ulmer as Reintaler, Kärntner Bauer 
 Elise Aulinger as Schönleitnerin 
 Sepp Nigg as Zoppel, Bauer 
 Lore Schuetzendorf as Frau Schoenleitner 
 Kurt Meisel as Erzherzog Johann
 Ferdinand Exl as Purtscheller, Kärntner Bauer
 Paul Mederow as Rusca, französischer General 
 Reinhold Pasch as Henri Daru, französischer Oberst 
 Karl Fochler as Burron, französischer Offizier 
 Klaus Pohl as Kranewitter, Kärntner Bauer 
 Carl Balhaus as Kärntner Bauernbursche 
 Anton Färber as Kärntner Bauernbursche 
 Julius Eckhoff as Französischer Soldat 
 Karl Gelfius as Sänger 
 Luis Gerold as Holznagel, Bauer 
 Leopold Kerscher as Junger Bauernbursche 
 Robert Thiem as Offizier  
 Aruth Wartan as Knecht mit der Augenklappe

References

Bibliography 
 George L. Mosse. Fallen Soldiers: Reshaping the Memory of the World Wars. Oxford University Press, 1991.

External links 
 

1940 films
1940s historical adventure films
German historical adventure films
Films of Nazi Germany
1940s German-language films
Films directed by Luis Trenker
Films set in Austria
Films set in the Alps
Films set in 1809
Napoleonic Wars films
Mountaineering films
German black-and-white films
Films shot at Bavaria Studios
Bavaria Film films
Depictions of Napoleon on film
Cultural depictions of Klemens von Metternich
Films set in the Austrian Empire
1940s German films